"Wish I Didn't Know Now" is a song written and recorded by American country music singer Toby Keith. It was released in February 1994 as the fourth and final single from his self-titled debut album. The song peaked at number 2 on the U.S. Billboard Hot Country Songs chart, and at number 17 on the Canadian RPM Country Tracks chart.

Content
In the song, the narrator talks about how he suspected his lover was cheating and now that he found out his suspicions were right.
The title lyric originates from the Bob Seger & the Silver Bullet Band song "Against the Wind"

Music video
The music video was directed by Marc Ball, and was filmed in black and white. It features Keith singing the song in a dark house, while raining outside. Scenes also feature him, socializing with a girlfriend, and at times, other couples, and bar patrons. It premiered on CMT on March 2, 1994, where they named it a "Hot Shot" video of the week.

Chart performance
"Wish I Didn't Know Now" debuted at number 54 on the US Billboard Hot Country Singles & Tracks chart dated March 19, 1994. It charted for twenty weeks on that chart, and peaked at number 2 for the week of May 28, 1994, behind Tim McGraw's "Don't Take the Girl".

Charts

Year-end charts

References

1994 singles
Toby Keith songs
Songs written by Toby Keith
Song recordings produced by Harold Shedd
Mercury Records singles
1993 songs
PolyGram singles
Black-and-white music videos